The 1958 Wyoming gubernatorial election took place on November 4, 1958. Incumbent Republican Governor Milward Simpson ran for re-election to a second term. He was challenged by John J. Hickey, the former U.S. Attorney for the District of Wyoming and the Democratic nominee. Following a close campaign, Hickey narrowly defeated Simpson for re-election, winning just a narrow plurality because of a third-party candidate in the race. In an irony, just four years later, in the 1962 special U.S. Senate election, Simpson would defeat Hickey, avenging his loss in the gubernatorial election.

Democratic primary

Candidates
 John J. Hickey, former U.S. Attorney for the District of Wyoming

Results

Republican Primary

Candidates
 Milward Simpson, incumbent Governor
 Stanley Edwards, former state civil defense director, former deputy state adjutant general

Results

Results

References

1958 Wyoming elections
1958
Wyoming
November 1958 events in the United States